Adickdid was an American all-female punk rock band, started in the early 1990s in Eugene, Oregon, United States, by Kaia Wilson, Nalini Cheriel, and Sara Shelton Bellum. They toured alongside other riot grrrl bands. Their first single "All American Girl" b/w "Columbus" was put out by Imp Records in 1993. One of their opening acts was Beck at the Jabberjaw in Los Angeles. They recorded the song "Hair" on the Stars Kill Rock compilation for Kill Rock Stars. They also recorded a song for Yoyo Records. Their album, Dismantle, was put out on Imp and their own record label G Records in 1993. Members went on to form The Butchies and Team Dresch. Adickdid broke up in 1995.

Discography

Albums
 Dismantle (G) (1993)
 Adicktid (IMP) (1994)

Single
 "All American Girl" / "Columbo" (IMP) (1993)

Compilation appearances
 Julep-Another Yoyo Studio Compilation (Yoyo Recordings|Yoyo) (1993) - "Bugs In Nevada"
 Stars Kill Rock (Kill Rock Stars) (1993) - "Hair"
 The Sound Guy Is Deaf And Drunk: 16 Band Recorded Live At John Henry's cassette (Soda Girl) (1995) - "Ask Nicely"
 Kill Rock Stars/Stars Kill Rock/Rock Stars Kill (Kill Rock Stars) (2013) - "Hair"

References

Musical groups from Eugene, Oregon
Punk rock groups from Oregon
All-female punk bands
Riot grrrl bands
1995 disestablishments in Oregon
Musical groups disestablished in 1995
1990s establishments in Oregon
Feminist musicians